G45 may refer to:
 List of Intel chipsets#Core 2 chipsets
 HMS Quail (G45)
 G45 Daqing–Guangzhou Expressway in China